John Clarkson Stewart (born 2 March 1952), known as John Altman, is an English actor and singer, perhaps best known for playing Nick Cotton in the popular BBC soap opera EastEnders. He was among the show's original cast members appearing in the first episode in February 1985 and appeared on the show on and off as a recurring character. His character was killed off in the 30th anniversary episode of the show which aired in February 2015. Altman has also appeared in several films, television series and stage productions. In 2010, he became the new frontman of the band Heavy Metal Kids following the death of former frontman Gary Holton in 1985.

Early life
Altman was born in Reading, Berkshire, to parents Tina Florence (née Schofield; 1920–2016) and Cecil Clifton Stewart (1923–1991). His maternal grandfather was actor Johnnie Schofield.

Career
Altman made his acting debut in the 1979 film The First Great Train Robbery where he played a minor role. Also in 1979, he portrayed musician George Harrison in the biographical television film Birth of The Beatles. He made brief appearances in several other films including Quadrophenia (1979), An American Werewolf in London (1981) and Memoirs of a Survivor (1981). In 1980, Altman worked as a model in creating prototypes of the Hawkmen that appear in the Dino De Laurentiis–produced film, Flash Gordon but did not appear in the film itself. In 1982, Altman played the role of a Royal Navy rating alongside Timothy Spall in the Channel 4 film Remembrance. Altman also featured in a 1982 short public information film, "Stupid Git", part of the British government's campaign against drink-driving.

In 1985, he began appearing as Nick Cotton in the new BBC television soap opera EastEnders, appearing in the first episode on 19 February that year. He went on to make recurring appearances on the show in a span of 30 years. He has had a major role in many famous storylines in the show including the murders of Reg Cox (whose body was found in the first episode) and Eddie Royle, his attempt to kill his own mother Dot by poisoning her and his various feuds with characters including Pete Beale, Den Watts and Mark Fowler. He also contributed towards the death of his own son Ashley by sabotaging a motorbike which Ashley ended up stealing and crashing.

His character was also given his own television spin-off episode titled Return of Nick Cotton which was completely centered around his character and aired in October 2000. 

In 2015, his character was killed off in the episode that aired on 13 February 2015 and he made his final appearance as a corpse in the episode that marked the 30th anniversary of the show on 19 February 2015. His body was found in the same way as his victim Reg Cox was found in the first episode 30 years earlier. A year earlier, his character's death had been announced in the show, only for it to emerge within a few months that Nick had faked his own death. Altman tells that producers were told to 'write him out' of the show after he opposed a decision to make his character gay.

In 1991, he played Thomas de Quincy in Malcolm Mclaren's 'The Ghosts of Oxford Street', where he appeared outside a purported subterranean 'Boots Apothecary', the origin of an urban myth that there is a parallel abandoned Victorian shopping street 'under' Oxford Street, London. This was actually the under-pavement storage vaults of 20-22 Stratford Place.

Away from television, he also appeared in an adult pantomime, which released on video in 1994 titled Pussy in Boots. In the pantomime he appeared alongside fellow EastEnders cast members Mike Reid and Barbara Windsor. In 2001 he won the Rear of the Year Award alongside Claire Sweeney. In the same year he also performed in the Leiber and Stoller tribute evening at the Hammersmith Apollo, singing Trouble, originally performed by Elvis Presley.

In 2002, he toured around the UK playing Billy Flynn in the long-running musical Chicago. He also appeared in the John Godber written stage play Bouncers opposite fellow soap actor Nigel Pivaro who is best known for playing a similar style of character, Terry Duckworth in Coronation Street. Both Terry and Nick are the sons of long-running established characters, both are estranged from their mothers, both have committed 
criminal acts and both have made sporadic, on-off appearances on their respective show. 

In 2004, he made an appearance in the comedy sketch series Bo' Selecta! as his EastEnders character. In 2006, Altman was set to appear in an upcoming British film called It's Been Real, the trailer can be seen on YouTube. It still has yet to be released in cinemas. John Altman also appeared on 18 July 2009 episode of Totally Saturday by climbing out of the boot of a car.

In August 2010, he joined a band called Heavy Metal Kids. From late 2010, until early 2011, Altman appeared in adverts for Daz along with actors (Michael Starke and Amanda Barrie), from rival soap opera Coronation Street. In February 2011, he appeared on Live from Studio Five. In January 2012, he appeared as one of the first five couples in the third series of Celebrity Coach Trip partnering fellow actor Derek Martin.

In February 2015, he appeared as a guest on The Graham Norton Show as part of an EastEnders special episode alongside June Brown, Adam Woodyatt, Letitia Dean, Danny Dyer, Kellie Bright, Shane Richie, Jessie Wallace and Pam St. Clement.

In February 2017, he appeared in June Brown at 90 – A Walford Legend, a special BBC documentary that aired to celebrate June Brown's 90th birthday. 
           
In April 2020, he appeared with 7 other celebrities in the 4th series of the BBC travel documentary series The Real Marigold Hotel, filmed in Puducherry, India.

Personal life
In 1986, Altman married Bridgette Poodhun. They divorced in 1997. He has one daughter.

Altman released his autobiography, In the Nick of Time, which was published on 30 June 2016.

Filmography

Films

TV

References

External links 
 
 John Altman profile
 BBC John Altman Interview

1952 births
Living people
actors from Reading, Berkshire
English male film actors
English male soap opera actors
English male stage actors
English rock singers